The National Union of Government and Federated Workers is a trade union in Trinidad and Tobago. It was formed on 3 June 1967 out of a merger between the National Union of Government Employees and the Federated Workers Trade Union.  It is the largest union in the country.

At the inaugural convention, union leaders declared: "It is recognised that labour unity is essential to the social, economic and political progress of all workers. It is recognised, too, that the fragmentation of the labour movement inhibits such progress."

See also

 List of trade unions
 Nathaniel Crichlow

References

Trade unions in Trinidad and Tobago
Agriculture and forestry trade unions
Public Services International
Trade unions established in 1967
Agricultural organizations based in the Caribbean